A Feather in Her Hat is a 1935 melodrama film starring Pauline Lord as a working-class woman with ambitions for her son. It is based on the 1934 novel of the same name by I. A. R. Wylie.

Plot
In 1925 London, middle-aged, widowed shopkeeper Clarissa Phipps (Pauline Lord) pities genteel, but homeless drunkard Captain Randolph Courtney (Basil Rathbone) and takes him in. When Courtney corrects the lower-class accent and grammar of her son Richard, a germ of an idea is born. Richard benefits from Courtney's tutelage as he grows up.

Ten years later, on Richard's twenty-first birthday, Clarissa makes a startling announcement. She is not his mother, but was merely hired to raise him for his upper-class parents. She gives him a bank passbook with a balance of £1000 as arranged with his real mother and asks him to move out on his own. Richard (Louis Hayward) and Courtney are both stunned. Emily Judson (Nydia Westman), with whom Richard has grown up, is distressed as well; she had hoped to marry him, but now feels he is out of her reach.

From Clarissa's private papers and what she had said, Courtney guesses that Richard's mother is Julia Trent Anders (Billie Burke), a former star actress. Would-be playwright Richard, seeking to get to know her, becomes a lodger in her mansion, where he also meets her absentminded scientist husband Paul (Victor Varconi) and her beautiful stepdaughter Pauline (Wendy Barrie). Richard and Pauline are attracted to each other, much to the annoyance of rival suitor Leo Cartwright (David Niven). Pauline becomes aware of Emily's prior claim, however, and desists.

When Julia discovers that her tenant has written a play (with a starring role suitable for her comeback), she introduces him to her friend, producer Sir Elroyd Joyce (Thurston Hall). Joyce reads his play as a favor to Julia; however, while he sees promise in Richard's work, it would be too expensive for him to produce. When Clarissa finds out, she sells her shop and uses most of the proceeds to secretly finance it without Richard's knowledge.

She and Courtney proudly attend the premiere of Son of Sixpence. The play is a success, but the experience is too much for Clarissa, already in very bad health. On her deathbed, she admits to Richard that she is actually his mother after all. Emily, admitting defeat, concedes Richard to Pauline.

Cast

 Pauline Lord as Clarissa Phipps
 Basil Rathbone as Captain Randolph Courtney
 Louis Hayward as Richard Orland
 Billie Burke as Julia Trent Anders
 Wendy Barrie as Pauline Anders
 Nydia Westman as Emily Judson
 Victor Varconi as Paul Anders
 Thurston Hall as Sir Elroyd Joyce
 Nana Bryant as Lady Drake
 J. M. Kerrigan as Pobjay
 Doris Lloyd as Liz Vanning
 David Niven as Leo Cartwright
 John Rogers as Henry Vining

References

External links
 
 
 
 

1935 films
American drama films
Films based on Australian novels
Films directed by Alfred Santell
Films set in London
American black-and-white films
Columbia Pictures films
1935 drama films
Melodrama films
Films based on works by I. A. R. Wylie
1930s American films